Gert Doumen (born 24 June 1971 in Bree) is a retired Belgian football goalkeeper who played several seasons at the highest level of professional football with Genk, RWDM, Mouscron and Heusden-Zolder.

Doumen started his career with Genk, where he was promoted from the youth ranks to the first team squad in 1991. For several seasons, he was often the second goalkeeper behind Ronny Gaspercic and István Brockhauser, although he collected over 49 games with Genk. As such he was part of the team that played at the highest level of Belgian football between 1991-1994 and 1996-2000, including the promotion from the second division in 1996 and the first division title in 1999. Thereafter, he moved on to first division teams Mouscron and RWDM, staying one season each time, before trying his luck in the lower leagues with Patro Eisden. He was called back into the first league by newly promoted Heusden-Zolder and stayed with the team when they relegated until the team went bankrupt and folded the season thereafter in 2006. In November 2006, he was signed by OH Leuven as a spare keeper after severe injuries to first keepers Mike Van Hamel and Thierry Berghmans and played a few matches before being released after their recovery in February 2007. Thereafter he had a short spell back at Patro Eisden, where he stopped his playing career and started coaching the goalkeepers of the youth squad.

References

1971 births
Living people
Belgian footballers
Belgian Pro League players
Challenger Pro League players
K.R.C. Genk players
Royal Excel Mouscron players
R.W.D. Molenbeek players
K. Patro Eisden Maasmechelen players
Oud-Heverlee Leuven players
Association football goalkeepers
People from Bree, Belgium
Footballers from Limburg (Belgium)